Prathamesh Parab (born 29 November 1993) is an Indian actor who works in Marathi cinema. He played a small role in Balak Palak before playing a lead character in Timepass. He reprised his role in its sequel Timepass 2 as a younger version of his own character. He received the Star Studded Annual Life Ok Screen Awards in 2014.

Education
Parab did his schooling at the M.L Dahanukar College of Commerce in Mumbai where he graduated with a Bachelors in Banking and Insurance.

Filmography

Feature films

Awards

References

External links

 
 
 

Indian male film actors
Male actors in Marathi cinema
Male actors in Hindi cinema
Living people
Male actors from Mumbai
1993 births
21st-century Indian male actors